The Oswestry by-election was a Parliamentary by-election held on 26 July 1904. The constituency returned one Member of Parliament (MP) to the House of Commons of the United Kingdom, elected by the first past the post voting system.

Vacancy
George Ormsby-Gore had been Conservative MP for the seat of Oswestry since the 1901 Oswestry by-election. On 26 June 1904 he succeeded his father as third Baron Harlech and entered the House of Lords.

Electoral history
The seat had been Conservative since it was created in 1885. They easily held the seat at the last election, with an increased majority:

Candidates
The local Conservative Association selected 39-year-old William Bridgeman as their candidate to defend the seat. He was a prominent Municipal Reform Party member of the London County Council and had no link with the town's area, although his country home, Leigh Manor, Worthen, was then in the same constituency. He was assistant private secretary to Henry Holland, the Colonial Secretary (1889–1892), and then to Sir Michael Hicks-Beach, the Chancellor of the Exchequer from 1895 to 1897. In 1897 he became a member of the London School Board, and in 1904 he was elected to the London County Council.

The local Liberal Association selected 42-year-old Allan Heywood Bright as their candidate to gain the seat. He had been the Liberal candidate at the previous by-election in 1901. Previously he had contested Exeter in 1899 and 1900. He had a residence at Weston Rhyn near Oswestry. The Times noted that he had "nursed the constituency assiduously of late".

Campaign
Polling Day was fixed for 26 July 1904, 30 days after the previous MP went to the House of Lords. 

During the campaign, where tariff reform and free trade were topical issues, Winston Churchill, then M.P. for Oldham made eve-of-poll speeches at public meetings organised by the Free Trade Union in Ellesmere and Oswestry in support of Bright. He had crossed the floor of the Commons from the Conservative benches to the Liberals on 31 May, so was reportedly heckled with "turn-coat" taunts.

Result
The count was conducted the following morning and the result declared at lunch-time. Crowds filled the Bailey Head in Oswestry – so much so that it was thought advisable to announce the result in private to prevent trouble.
The Liberals gained the seat from the Conservatives:

The result was "a great surprise for both Conservatives and Liberals alike". Bright believed that the electorate had rejected the government, and that "the whole of Shropshire politics had been simply a policy of Tory bluff and the people seemed to have got tired of it".

Aftermath
The same two candidates met again at the following General Election, the result was:

References

See also 

 2021 North Shropshire by-election

1904 elections in the United Kingdom
1904 in England
20th century in Shropshire
By-elections to the Parliament of the United Kingdom in Shropshire constituencies
Oswestry